Marginella orstomi is a species of colorful small sea snail, a marine gastropod mollusk in the family Marginellidae.

The marine malacofauna of West Africa is rich in Marginellidae. The holotype of Marginella orstomi was collected at a depth of between 200 and 250 m, off Pointe Noire, Republic of Congo. (A related species was dredged from a more northern locality off the coast of Congo.) The species is also related to Marginella huberti Clover, 1972, from Lobito, Angola.

Description 
The shell is of medium size, elongate pear-shaped, with 4½ whorls.  The shell has a ground coloration of dirty yellow with dark areas, and a pattern consisting of many dark grey transverse irregular zigzag lines sometimes crossed by spiral rows of small dots.

The apex of the shell is sharp, the angle of the spire is about 70°. The aperture is straight and rather narrow, about ¾ of the length of the shell.  The color pattern on the outside of the body whorl is visible on the inside of the aperture, and the outer lip is thickened and deflected outward. On the outside about 30 to 35 grey transverse stripes are present. The inner surface of the lip is almost smooth, with one tooth near the posterior end.  There are four white oblique plaits on the anterior half of the columella.

Type material 
 Holotype (adult)    28.0 x 15.1 mm Zoölogisch Museum, University of Amsterdam
 Paratype (adult)    23.4 x 12.5 mm Zoölogisch Museum, University of Amsterdam
 Paratype (juvenile) 25.4 x 12.3 mm Zoölogisch Museum, University of Amsterdam

Remarks 
Marginella orstomi is closely related to Marginella huberti , which was collected further south, on the Angolan coast. Both species are characterized by the presence of a white tooth on the inside of the outer lip near the posterior end. Some differences in the shell of both species are mentioned here:

Comparative M. orstomi vs M. huberti

References 

 Coomans, H.E. 1975 Marginella orstomi. A new species from deeper water off the coast of West Africa (Gastropoda, Marginellidae). Bulletin Zoologisch Museum, Universiteit von Amsterdam vol.4 No.12

Endemic fauna of the Republic of the Congo
Marginellidae
Gastropods described in 1975